John R. Lewis High School is a public high school in Springfield, Virginia. It is a part of Fairfax County Public Schools (FCPS) and opened in 1958. The school was originally named Robert E. Lee High School (Lee High School) after Robert E. Lee, the American and Confederate general, but starting at the beginning of the 2020–2021 school year it was renamed John R. Lewis High School after John Lewis, the recently deceased politician and civil rights leader. The school name changes began shortly after the vote was announced. Lewis High School athletic teams are known as the Lancers.

History

At the time the school opened, the Fairfax County school board was opposing racial integration of its schools, and the name reflected the school board's sentiments.

This school is located on Franconia Road across the street of Springfield Town Center, on the border of Franconia and Springfield. The area had a Springfield address and was in the Franconia district of Virginia.

During a meeting on February 4, 1958, a local historical group suggested a compromise. The Upper Pohick Community League submitted a letter proposing that the school board adopt a policy of naming Fairfax County schools after prominent Virginians instead of by place names and that the Franconia High School be renamed something like "Fitzhugh, Lee, etc."

Fitzhugh Lee was suggested because he was born at the Clermont estate. Clermont Elementary School is about 4 miles away, in Alexandria. 

During a meeting on May 6, 1958, Mr. Solomon made a motion that all future new high schools in Fairfax County be named for some prominent American, now deceased.  Mr. Solomon qualified it by stating that the "Franconia H.S." is not to be included in this motion, just those under construction, or proposed. Therefore, a place name was needed for this school. Both communities were in the Lee district of Virginia and a compromise was reached on a place name.
 
Mr. Woodson said he was "surprised and disappointed that we have this type of controversy among adults. I don't want the children coming to this school saying I'm from Springfield ... I'm from Franconia ... let's fight. Gangs tend to develop in communities where there is controversy." School Board member Mr. Davis said that "He'd rather name a school Podunk then get into the battle like was over Lee High school." The name J.E.B. Stuart was chosen because he had his headquarters on Munson Hill, the site of the school.

The naming of high schools in order was Lee, (for the Lee district, May 1958), J.E.B. Stuart and James Madison (same meeting, on Oct 7, 1958). Thomas Edison, George Marshall, and W.T. Woodson in 1960, Thomas Jefferson in 1962. In addition, nine intermediate schools were named by the same school board in May 1959. Among those school names were John G. Whittier and Henry Thoreau. Fifteen schools were named and only one was for a Confederate general. In 1963, Lee was renamed at the request of the SPTA. That was six years later.

Regarding Fairfax County's reaction to Brown: It was not Fairfax County's choice either before or after 1954.  Fairfax County Schools, like most southern schools, were under de jure segregation.  After the Brown v. Board of Education decision, Daniel Duke, who authored Education Empire wrote: "Whether local school systems such as Fairfax County left to their own, would have moved forward to implement desegregation in the late '50s will never be known. Richmond removed any possibility of local option." it was recognized in court cases that it was the state who was running the show, not the county. They didn't have a choice. In the Virginia General Assembly:  delegates from Northern Virginia openly opposed the Stanley Plans as well as calls for even more radical legislation. Virginia's 10th district was the only congressional district to vote against the Gray Plan.

Following a multi-year campaign by two African-American female teenage students to change the school's name, on June 23, 2020, the school board unanimously voted to rename the school. On July 23, 2020, the Fairfax County School Board announced that the school would be renamed to John R. Lewis High School, after John Lewis, the recently deceased politician and civil rights leader. The name change will be effective for the 2020–2021 school year.

Demographics
In the 2016–2017 school year, Lewis High School's total enrollment was 2132, with a student body composed of 36.84% Hispanic, 25.41% Asian, 20.07% White, 14.10% Black, and 3.58% other.

Administration 

Lewis High School has served the Springfield community since it opened in 1958. Like many schools in Fairfax County, Lewis reflects the increasing diversity of its student body. Student families have origins in 42 countries (mostly Latin American) and speak more than 34 languages.

The integration of technology into the instructional program continues to be a major initiative.  The labs are equipped with computers, digital cameras, and scanners for computer graphics and photography classes, and a fully computerized CAD lab is available for technical drawing and engineering classes.

Deirdre Lavery was principal from 2014 to 2019. Alfonso Smith was appointed as principal in January 2020.

Career Center

Lewis High School has a College and Career Center inside the school.  It is currently run by Carla McIlnay-Shaw (From the Career Center). Its goal is to provide students with college planning services through the use of computer software, videos, catalogs, and visits by college representatives from state and national colleges and universities. Career planning, military options, scholarship, and financial aid information are also available. Throughout the year, many special programs are presented for both parents and students.

International Baccalaureate program
The International Baccalaureate (IB) Program is open to all 11th- and 12th-grade students at Lewis High School and presents a "varied and rigorous" program of studies. IB is a comprehensive, integrated program that places as much value on the process of knowledge (teaching the student to analyze and apply knowledge) as the product (preparing the student for the content and assessments). IB courses present options for students to pursue a mixture of major interests (higher-level courses) and less major interests (standard level courses).

With the IB program offered at Lewis High School, students are provided with an internationally recognized educational program which purports to provide a more rigorous and college-preparatory education. Furthermore, an advantage of taking IB courses in Lewis High School is that students get a chance to receive college credit (although the more common Advanced Placement, or AP, program also provides college credit.) Getting college credit depends on the score the student gets on their IB exam, usually a 6 or 7, and the guidelines for IB transfer credit the college or university the student chooses to attend has.

Student activities

Honor societies

Students are selected for membership through an application process and sometimes interviews are conducted. Candidates must meet the chapter's requirement for scholarship, service, leadership, and character in order to be selected for membership. Continued participation in service projects is required to retain membership. Members must also maintain the chapter's required cumulative GPA and have a good understanding of the language, or specialty.

Student government

The Student Government Association consists of elected and selected students who represent the entire student body. The objectives of the SGA are to promote school spirit, initiative and unity among the different classes and students, coordinate school activities and to provide a means of communication among administration, faculty, and students. The SGA sponsors Homecoming Dance, Homecoming Elections, Powder Puff Game, Chili Cook-Off, Homecoming Parade, Family Feud, The Senior vs. Faculty Basketball Game, Blizzard Blast, Mr. and Ms. Irresistible, International Night, three pep rallies (Fall, Winter, Spring), class elections and balloting among many other school activities.

Publications

The Lance is Lewis High School's monthly newspaper. A student-run newspaper with a staff of approximately 20, The Lance covers news and events in the school, community, and nation. The Lance won Trophy Class, the highest honor bestowed by the Virginia High School League (VHSL), in 2003–2004 and 2005–2006. 

The Shield, Lewis's yearbook, serves as an informational record, memory and historical reference for the students and faculty as well as the Lewis High School's community at-large. The Shield covers academics, sports, student activities and student accomplishments with fairness and accuracy. The content is decided upon by the student staff members enrolled in Photojournalism 1, 2, and 3. Recruiting to become part of the staff typically takes place in early February when course selections are being made for the next year. Students are selected through a process that includes a written application, teacher recommendations, and interviews OR through successful completion of Journalism 1. Lewis's 2006–2007 edition of the yearbook was named a Pacemaker finalist.

The Troubador is a literary magazine by and for the students of John R. Lewis High School, published to promote an interest in the arts by showcasing student art and literature.

Lancer Theatre

The Theatre Department at Lewis High School produces two mainstages a year: a fall play and a spring musical. One of the mainstage shows is selected as the Cappies competition piece. Lancer Theatre Department also usually produces a competition piece in October to perform at the Virginia Theatre Association conference. Lancer Theatre's Thespians, troupe 362 of the International Thespian Society, produces an annual Murder Mystery dinner show in September, a Lancer Idol voice competition in December, theatre parties, fundraising, and other community events. To be part of the Thespian Honors Society one must collect 30 points in theatre, which are obtained by being in shows, seeing productions, and so on. Lancer Theatre also has a Drama Club that is open to all current and alumni Lewis students. Drama Club includes theatre updates, food, fun, games, and theatre sports.  Finally, Lewis High School offers theatre classes, including Theatre 1–4, IB Theatre 1–2, and Technical Theatre.

Marching band

The marching band includes members from the top two bands, Wind Ensemble and Symphonic Band. Also referred to as the Marching Lancers, they attend all the varsity home football games and play during the halftime show.

In the 2006 year, The Lewis Marching Lancers achieved a superior rating at the VBODA state marching festival, in Winchester, and later received the title of a "Virginia Honor Band."

Sports

Lewis High School offers an array of sports and sporting clubs, including Football, Basketball, Soccer, Baseball, Tennis, Lacrosse, Track and Field, Swimming, Diving, Wrestling, Golf, Indoor Track, Cross Country, Marching band, Field Hockey, Softball, and Volleyball. Sports are offered at Freshmen, Junior Varsity, and Varsity levels. Lewis's sports compete in Virginia's National District.

Football

Track and field
John R. Lewis High School has a successful Track and Field program. It has produced All-District, All-Region, All-State and All-American athletes. In 2007 the Lewis track team came in third in the AAA Virginia State meet. Track coach Gary Powell was awarded Coach of the Year by The Washington Post in 2007. Many Lewis track team athletes continue on with their Track and Field careers onto the collegiate level, including alumnus Terry Cobb (Class of 1966) and Sean Holston (Class of 2007).

Basketball
The Girls' Varsity Basketball team won the Northern Region title for the 2007–2008 season.
The Boys' basketball team had a notable alumni Sirvaliant Brown who attended George Washington University in 2001 and was second in the nation in scoring as a freshman.

Softball
The Lancer softball program has shown considerable improvement over the past 5 years. In 2015 they were ranked as high as #6 in the All-Met rankings and have made regionals the past four years in a row. (2014, 2015, 2016, 2017).

Soccer
Lately, the only spring sport that has made it to regionals twice in the Patriot District.

Golf
Lewis's Tyler Spears from the Class of 2014, won the Patriot District Golf Title in October 2010, 2nd place in October 2012 and won in October 2012. He became the first Lewis golfer to win the Golf title in 13 years.

Overall, the Golf team won second place in the Patriot district Tournament in 2012.

Notable alumni 

 Anne Abernathy, Class of 1971 – "Grandma Luge" has made six appearances in the Winter Olympics and in 2016 Summer Olympics for archery; listed in Guinness Book of Records as first woman over age 50 to compete in the Winter Olympics.
 Sarah Baker –  actress best known for roles in movies such as The Campaign and Mascots and TV shows like Louie and Go On.
 Melissa Belote – triple gold medalist in 1972 Summer Olympics in swimming.
 SirValiant Brown – professional basketball player
 Darren "Venus Brown" Floyd (graduated 1987) – A&R / executive producer of will.i.am, The Black Eyed Peas, Justin Timberlake, Fergie, Macy Gray.
 Bill Courtney, Class of '88- Bucknell University basketball player, College basketball coach
 John Engelberger, Class of 1995 – defensive end for Virginia Tech, San Francisco 49ers and Denver Broncos.
 Sabrina Harman (graduated 1996) – U.S. Army reservist convicted in connection with the 2003–2004 Abu Ghraib prisoner abuse scandal in Baghdad, Iraq.

 Christina Tosi, Class of 1999 – chef, author, and television personality on MasterChef.

References

External links 
 

Lewis Athletics
Lee Drama

Educational institutions established in 1958
High schools in Fairfax County, Virginia
1958 establishments in Virginia
Public high schools in Virginia
Springfield, Virginia
Name changes due to the George Floyd protests